<< List of Vanity Fair caricatures (1900–1904) >> List of Vanity Fair caricatures (1910–1914)

Next List of Vanity Fair (British magazine) caricatures (1910-1914)

 
1900s in the United Kingdom